María Belén Pérez Maurice (born 12 July 1985) is an Argentinian sabre fencer who was Pan American champion in 2014. She was the only representative of the sport from Argentina at the 2012 Summer Olympics in London, the 2016 Summer Olympics in Rio, and the 2020 Summer Olympics in Tokyo.

Career

Pérez Maurice started fencing at the age of thirteen at the instigation of her mother, an amateur fencer. She did not like the sport at first but took an interest after her first victory. She trained at the Círculo Militar in Buenos Aires–her father is a colonel in the Argentine Army– under Lucas Saucedo, who remains her coach as of 2014.

She first fenced foil, a weapon in which she reached the quarter-finals at the 2006 Buenos Aires World Cup, then switched to sabre for the 2006–07 season. She began a career as a fashion model parallel to her sport career but had to abandon it for lack of time. In 2011, she won two satellite tournaments and earned a bronze medal at the Pan American Championships in Reno, Nevada. These results allowed her to qualify for the 2012 Summer Olympics as one of the top two fencers from the American zone. She is the first Argentinian to gain Olympic access through FIE rankings. She lost 15–12 in the first round to Italy's Gioia Marzocca and finished 21st. In the 2013–14 season she won the gold medal at the Pan American Championships in San José after defeating Olympic champion Mariel Zagunis in the final. She finished the season No.21 in world rankings, a career-best.

Pérez Maurice studied food engineering at the Universidad Argentina de la Empresa.

María Belén won the bronze medal at the 2015 Pan American Games in Toronto, Canada.

She competed at the 2020 Summer Olympics. She lost to Manon Brunet in the bronze medal match.  She accepted a marriage proposal from her coach and partner Lucas Saucedo.

References

External links

 
 
 
 
 
 
 

1985 births
Living people
Argentine female foil fencers
Argentine female sabre fencers
Argentine people of French descent
Olympic fencers of Argentina
Fencers at the 2012 Summer Olympics
Fencers at the 2016 Summer Olympics
Fencers at the 2020 Summer Olympics
Pan American Games bronze medalists for Argentina
Pan American Games medalists in fencing
Fencers at the 2015 Pan American Games
Medalists at the 2015 Pan American Games
Fencers from Buenos Aires
21st-century Argentine women